Victoria Barracks is an Australian Army base in Sydney, New South Wales, Australia. Victoria Barracks is located in the suburb of Paddington, between Oxford Street and Moore Park Road. It is just north of the Moore Park, the Sydney Cricket Ground and Sydney Football Stadium. Victoria Barracks houses the Headquarters Forces Command.

Listed on the Commonwealth Heritage List in 2004, the site contains one of the most important groups of Edwardian military buildings in Australia. The Army Museum of NSW is housed in the original District Military Prison, constructed in 1847. It is open to visitors on Thursday from 10:00 a.m. to 12:30 p.m. and the first Sunday each month (by appointment) from 10:00 a.m. until 3:30 p.m. The museum is closed during December and January. Tours of the Barracks precinct are conducted by the Corps of Guides on Thursdays starting at 10:00 a.m.

The Australian Army Band Sydney is located at Victoria Barracks.

History
The Regency style main barracks building was constructed of Hawkesbury sandstone by convicts between 1841 and 1846. The first building completed was the Officers' Quarters which was completed in 1842.

The Main Barrack Block was completed in 1846 and was designed to accommodate 650 soldiers. The bell and clock were added to the building in 1856. The barracks were originally occupied by regiments of the British Army. The British troops vacated the barracks in 1870. The barracks was the premier military training site in Australia for many years, from its completion until after Federation in 1901.

The bungalow was built in 1847 as the Barrack Master's Residence. The Garrison Hospital was built in 1845 to accommodate 36 patients. During the 1930s it was converted into an Officers' Mess.

The gate on Oxford Street is referred to as the Queen Victoria Gate, while the gate on Moore Park road is known as the Convict Gate. Busby's Bore, was Sydney's second water supply, built by convicts between 1827 and 1837. An access shaft is located at the museum.

For a brief period during the 1930s Victoria Barracks was home to the Royal Military College, Duntroon, when the College was forced to close its buildings in Canberra and relocate to Sydney due to the economic downturn caused by the Great Depression.

Gallery

See also

 Commonwealth Heritage List
 Military history of Australia

References

External links

Information page Australian War Memorial
 at 

Residential buildings in Sydney
Barracks in Australia
Victorian architecture in Sydney
Tourist attractions in Sydney
Commonwealth Heritage List places in New South Wales
1848 establishments in Australia
Military installations in New South Wales
Military installations established in 1848
Paddington, New South Wales